Tape delay may refer to:

Delay (audio effect), an audio effect reminiscent of an echo
Broadcast delay, the practice of intentionally delaying a radio and television broadcast of live material